The Enghelab Stadium is a multi-purpose stadium in Karaj, Iran. Currently, it is currently mostly used for football matches and is the home of football team Saipa as of 2001. It has a capacity of 15,000 people.

The stadium held the final match of the league in 2006–07 season for Saipa where they won the league. The stadium held a match between Iran and Indonesia in June 2009. The stadium also held an international match, on May 1, 2012, where Iran's National Football team played Mozambique.

International matches 

The Iran national football team has occasionally used Enghelab Stadium as their home base.

References

Football venues in Iran
Multi-purpose stadiums in Iran
Karaj
Buildings and structures in Alborz Province
Sport in Alborz Province
Sports venues completed in 2001
2001 establishments in Iran